Silk Way may refer to the following:
The Silk Road, a network of ancient trade routes connecting the Mediterranean region with the Middle East and Far East
Silk Way Airlines, a cargo airline from Azerbaijan